The men's 1500 metres was an event at the 1956 Summer Olympics in Melbourne, Australia, with the final held on Saturday, December 1, 1956. There were a total number of 37 participants from 22 nations. The maximum number of athletes per nation had been set at 3 since the 1930 Olympic Congress. The event was won by Ron Delany of Ireland, the nation's first 1500 metres medal. The silver medalist was Klaus Richtzenhain, the only medalist in the event for the United Team of Germany. John Landy took bronze, Australia's first medal in the event since 1896.

Summary

Among the non-qualifiers for the final were defending champion Josy Barthel, future silver medalist Michel Jazy and eventual marathon champion Mamo.

The final had twelve men toe the line.  Uniquely, Murray Halberg used a sprinter's crouched start in lane 1 and sprinted into the lead from the gun.  In future years, this kind of start would become forbidden in a long race.  Halberg held that lead until there were two laps to go where he was passed in a rush by Mervyn Lincoln running in front of a home crowd.  Lincoln held the lead until just after the bell when he was swallowed up by a rush led by Brian Hewson.  Ten men went around Lincoln and he was cooked. Klaus Richtzenhain was the next to follow with Halberg making one more rush down the backstretch before he too was cooked.  From tenth place, Ron Delany began picking off runners on the backstretch, as Halberg slowed, Delany used the traffic to step into fifth place at the start of the final turn.  Passing in lane 2, Delany ran around the field, catching Hewson at the head of the straightaway.  Hewson looked helplessly at Delany as he passed.  Fighting out of the group Delany passed at the start of the turn, another home town favorite John Landy chased from behind, still in sixth at the head of the straight.  With a stiff, upright sprinting style, Delany pulled away from the field.  Hewson struggled down the final straight, watching Richtzenhain run past on the outside.  Landy made a late final charge in lane 3 but just came up short in trying to catch Richtzenhain for silver.

Background

This was the 13th appearance of the event, which is one of 12 athletics events to have been held at every Summer Olympics. Two finalists from the 1952 Games returned: gold medalist Josy Barthel of Luxembourg and eighth-place finisher Ingvar Ericsson of Sweden. The world record had changed hands six times since the 1952 Games; three of the men who had had it but were surpassed (László Tábori of Hungary, John Landy of Australia, and Gunnar Nielsen of Denmark) competed in Melbourne, along with the man who still held it (István Rózsavölgyi of Hungary). Five men had run a sub-four minute mile; the first to do so (Roger Bannister of Great Britain, who had finished fourth in this event in 1952) had retired, but three of those men (Tábori, Landy, and Brian Hewson, also of Great Britain) competed.

Ethiopia and Pakistan each made their first appearance in the event; Germany competed as the United Team of Germany for the first time. The United States made its 13th appearance, the only nation to have competed in the men's 1500 metres at each Games to that point.

Competition format

After a one-Games stint at three rounds in 1952, the 1956 competition returned to two rounds. There were three heats with 15 runners each (before withdrawals), with the top four runners in each advancing to the typical 12-man final race.

Records

These were the standing world and Olympic records prior to the 1956 Summer Olympics.

During the final, Ron Delany set a new Olympic record at 3:41.2. The top ten men in the final all surpassed the old Olympic record; the eleventh man matched it.

Schedule

All times are Australian Eastern Standard Time (UTC+10)

Results

Semifinals

Semifinal 1

Semifinal 2

Semifinal 3

Overall results for semifinals

Final

References

External links
 
 Results

M
1500 metres at the Olympics
Men's events at the 1956 Summer Olympics